Nabawan is the capital of the Nabawan District in the Interior Division of Sabah, Malaysia. Its population was estimated to be around 31,807 in 2010, comprising mostly the indigenous Murut Tahol and Murut Paluan

References

External links 

Nabawan District
Towns in Sabah